Dara Greaney is the CEO of LEDLightExpert.com, an e-commerce lighting retailer. Previously he was CEO at BuyAutoParts.com, an e-commerce auto parts retailer headquartered in San Diego, California. Greaney was a co-founder of BuyAutoParts.com in 2002. He left in 2016.

Early life
Greaney graduated from the University of San Diego in 2000 with a Bachelor of Business Administration in Marketing and Finance. He went on to receive his master’s in Business Marketing and Entrepreneurship from San Diego State University in 2002. He was a member of the first place VCIC team in 2001

Leadership
While Greaney has been CEO, BuyAutoParts.com has been named to the Inc. 5000 Fastest Growing Companies List in 2011 (#1803), 2012 (#1575), 2013 (#2382), 2014 (#3339) and 2015(#4463). They earned the 'Five-Time Inc. 5000 Honoree' in 2015  In 2013, they were also named in the Internet Retailer Top 500 Guide, an award they won again in 2014. In 2013, BuyAutoParts.com was named number 41 of San Diego Business Journal’s list of Largest Private Companies and named number 50 again in 2014. The company had $52.9M in revenue and a 57% 3-Year growth rate in 2015.

Interviews and profiles
He discussed the Marketplace Fairness Act with Union-Tribune TV.
Greaney has been profiled in conjunction with BuyAutoParts.com in Parts and People, and his quotes have been used in San Diego Business Journal, MarketWatch, UT San Diego and numerous other news stories. Greaney was a featured speaker at ROI Revolution Retail Traffic & Conversion 2015 Summit. In February 2019 he was quoted for an article about LED stadium lighting in Sportz Business  and related energy changes in Energy Markets Today

References

Living people
American businesspeople
San Diego State University alumni
University of San Diego alumni
Year of birth missing (living people)